is a Japanese sports anime television series about figure skating. It was produced by MAPPA, directed by Sayo Yamamoto and written by Mitsurou Kubo. The character designs were by Tadashi Hiramatsu, and the music was composed by Taro Umebayashi and Taku Matsushiba. The figure skating choreography was by Kenji Miyamoto. The series revolves around the relationships between Japanese figure skater Yuri Katsuki, also known as Yuri K., his idol, Russian figure-skating champion Victor Nikiforov, and up-and-coming Russian skater Yuri Plisetsky, also known as Yuri P.; as Yuri K. and Yuri P. take part in the Figure Skating Grand Prix, with Victor acting as coach to Yuri K.

The series first premiered on TV Asahi on October 6, 2016, and finished airing on December 22, 2016, with a total of 12 episodes. The series was made available for streaming by Crunchyroll shortly after its broadcast in Japan, and then Funimation provided an English dub of the series, starting on October 24, 2016. In April 2017, it was announced that Yuri on Ice would return with a film featuring an original story.

The opening theme is "History Maker" by Dean Fujioka. The ending theme is "You Only Live Once" by Wataru Hatano. The Japanese release of Yuri on Ice had six Blu-ray/DVD sets; the first set was released on December 30, 2016. On February 6, 2018, Funimation released the series in the US on a combined DVD and Blu-Ray boxset. This set was released in the UK by Sony Pictures Home Entertainment on October 8, 2018.

Broadcast and distribution
Yuri on Ice aired on TV Asahi from October 6 to December 22, 2016. The anime was produced by MAPPA, directed by Sayo Yamamoto and written by Mitsurou Kubo, with character design by Tadashi Hiramatsu, music by Taro Umebayashi and Taku Matsushiba and figure-skating choreography by Kenji Miyamoto. The episodes were made available for streaming by Crunchyroll, and Funimation began streaming an English dub on October 24, 2016.

Yuri on Ice had six Blu-ray and DVD sets released in Japan. The first set, containing the first two episodes, was released on December 30, 2016. Each set included bonus content such as booklets, production audio commentary and costume-design and choreography videos.  On February 6, 2018, Funimation released the series in the US on a combined DVD and Blu-Ray boxset, with extras including textless opening and closing title sequences, trailers, commentary from the 11th episode, and the "Welcome to the Madness" original video anime. There is also a limited edition version including a chipboard collector's box with "cracked ice" holographic finish and silver foil, three art cards, and an 80-page book of illustrations and behind-the-scenes interviews with Sayo Yamamoto, Mitsurou Kubo, and Kenji Miyamoto. The Blu-ray/DVD set was released in the UK by Sony Pictures Home Entertainment on October 8, 2018.

The compilation CD , with the anime's 24 original songs, was released on December 21, 2016. The insert song "Yuri on Ice" was included in Piano Solo Chū Jōkyū Figure Skate Meikyoku-shū: Hyōyō ni Hibiku Melody 2016-2017, a piano book released on January 21, 2017 with music used by figure skaters (including Mao Asada and Yuzuru Hanyu). It was the only anime song in the music book release.

Episode list

Television series

OVA

Home video release

Japanese-language releases

English-language releases

Notes

References

Yuri on Ice
Yuri on Ice